Lucius Edward William Plantagenet Cary, 15th Viscount of Falkland (born 8 May 1935), styled Master of Falkland from 1961 to 1984, is a British nobleman and politician.

Background and education
Cary is the eldest of four children, and the only son of Lucius Cary, 14th Viscount of Falkland, and Constance Mary Berry, daughter of Captain Edward Berry. The Viscount of Falkland is the senior viscountcy in the peerage of Scotland, created in 1620 by King James VI.

Cary was educated at Wellington College in Berkshire, and was formerly an officer in the Hussars.

Political career
Cary succeeded his father in the viscountcy in 1984 and sat in the House of Lords with the Social Democratic Party, later joining the Liberal Democrats. Following the removal of the majority of hereditary peers under the House of Lords Act 1999, he was one of the ninety-two elected to remain. In 2011 Falkland left the Liberal Democrats and now sits as a Crossbencher. He is a supporter of Humanists UK, and has been a Vice-President of the Royal Stuart Society since 2015 (his ancestors were ardent Jacobites, and he holds the title of 10th Earl of Falkland in the Jacobite Peerage).

Family
The Viscount married Caroline Anne Butler, daughter of Lieut-Cmdr George Butler, in 1962; they were divorced in 1990. They have four children:

The Hon. Lucius Alexander Plantagenet Cary, Master of Falkland (born 1963)
Hon. Camilla Anne Cary (1965–1972)
Hon. Samantha Camilla Cary (born 1973)
Hon. Lucinda Mary Cary (born 1974)

He was married again in 1990 to Nicole Mackey, with whom he has one child:

Hon. Charles Byron Milburn Cary (born 1992)

Arms

References

External links

1935 births
Living people
British humanists
People educated at Wellington College, Berkshire
Liberal Democrats (UK) hereditary peers
8th King's Royal Irish Hussars officers
Social Democratic Party (UK) hereditary peers
Earls in the Jacobite peerage
Viscounts Falkland
Hereditary peers elected under the House of Lords Act 1999